McBey is a Scottish surname. Notable people with the surname include:

James McBey (1883–1959), Scottish artist and etcher
Marguerite McBey (1905–1999), American painter and photographer

See also

McBay

Scottish surnames